Homa Sarshar (also Romanized as Homā Sarshār; born 1946) is an Iranian-American author, activist, media personality, and award-winning journalist. She was a columnist for Zan-e-Ruz magazine and the Kayhan daily newspaper between 1964 and 1978.

Early life 
Sarshar was born in Shiraz in 1946 to a Jewish family and raised in Tehran. She moved to United States and settled in Los Angeles one year before the Iranian Revolution in 1978. She studied French literature at Tehran University, earning a bachelor's degree in the subject. She later obtained a master's degree in journalism from the University of Southern California. In 1993, Sarshar joined Human Rights Watch as an adviser.

Awards and honors 
Sarshar received the Ellis Island Medal of Honor in 2013. In Iran, the Iranian Women's Organization of Tehran presented Sarshar with a Medal for Special Achievement in Women's Rights.

Bibliography 
 Book of Now Ruz, Vol. 1–1988
 Book of Now Ruz, Vol. 2–1989
 Iranian Women's Image in Iranian Culture (ed.)–1993
 Iranian Women, Researches and Arts (ed.)–1993
 In the Back Alleys of Exile, 2 volumes–1993
 Women and Family in Iran and Abroad (ed.)–1994
 Women and Politics In Contemporary Iran (ed.)–1995
 Women, Sexuality and Islam (ed.)–1996
 Shaban Jafari, Naab Publishers (2002)
 Terua: The History of Contemporary Iranian Jews - Vol I (1996),
 The History of Contemporary Iranian Jews –Vol II, Center for Iranian Jewish Oral; Chap-i (1996),
 The History of Contemporary Iranian Jews –Vol III, Center for Iranian Jewish Oral; Unabridged edition (1999),
 The History of Contemporary Iranian Jews –Vol IV, Center for Iranian Jewish Oral; Unabridged edition (2000)

References

External Links 
 Homa sarshar official website
 
 
 

1946 births
Living people
Iranian Jews
Iranian emigrants to the United States
University of Tehran alumni
USC Annenberg School for Communication and Journalism alumni
American women's rights activists
American writers of Iranian descent
20th-century American writers
21st-century American writers
21st-century American women writers
20th-century American women writers
People from Shiraz
American people of Iranian-Jewish descent
20th-century Iranian people
21st-century Iranian people